Carbasalate calcium is an analgesic, antipyretic, and anti-inflammatory drug, as well as a platelet aggregation inhibitor. It is a chelate of calcium acetylsalicylate (the calcium salt of aspirin) and urea.

References 

Antiplatelet drugs
Combination drugs